The 2011 Melbourne Storm season was the 14th in the club's history. They competed in the NRL's 2011 Telstra Premiership and finished the regular season in first place, taking out the minor premiership.

Storm enjoyed a strong start to the season with a 7–3 record from the opening 10 rounds. Their run of stellar form continued, losing just two games for the remainder of the season. Both of those came on the eve of the finals but the team was still able to win the Minor Premiership, finishing two points clear of Manly. After beating Newcastle 18–8 in the Qualifying final, Storm's season was prematurely ended with a home preliminary final loss to the Warriors. Melbourne again finished the season with the competition's best defence. At the Dally M awards, the Club featured prominently. Gareth Widdop also enjoyed a breakout season, playing 25 games while making 16 line breaks and providing 16 try assists.

Season summary 

 The Storm played 9 of their first 13 games at AAMI Park.
 The Storm's 2011 season and revival commenced with their Round 1 clash with bitter rivals, the Manly-Warringah Sea Eagles, and Melbourne won 18–6.
 In Round 5 the Storm played the Parramatta Eels where their original 1998 jersey was worn by the players. This match had extra significance because it was the first time that coaches Craig Bellamy and Stephen Kearney faced off since Kearney departed the Storm as assistant at the end of 2010, to take on the Eels senior position. The Storm won convincingly, 38–0, for their first win over Parramatta since the 2009 Grand Final.
 The Anzac Day clash saw one of the Storm's largest home crowds with just over 22,000 attending the match, but the match was lost to the New Zealand Warriors by a narrow scoreline of 18–14.
 In Round 12 the Storm hosted the Cronulla Sharks at AAMI Park, in what was Cameron Smith's 200th NRL Game. The storm won 14-8 after a scoreless first half.
In Round 19 the Storm traveled to Canberra Stadium to take on the Raiders. The Storm won 26–0; the scoreline was significant because it marked the first time in the Raiders history that they had been held scoreless on their own home ground.
 In Round 20 the Storm hosted the Brisbane Broncos at AAMI Park almost 23,000 spectators attended the match which the Storm won 26 - 6. Cameron Smith notched up his 500th goal during this match, also the team wore a special jersey which was mostly Navy blue with a large grey and white V on the front, it also had the word "Melbourne" printed across the upper back. This jersey was to symbolise Victoria following the City of Melbourne's sponsorship of the match.
Round 21 saw the Storm stage a remarkable win away at Parramatta Stadium by coming back from 18 - 0 down at the 54-minute mark to win 22 - 18.
In Round 24 the Storm broke their winning streak record defeating the St George Illawarra Dragons 8–6 to win their 12th consecutive match. They also had their highest home crowd of the season and their 4th highest home crowd of all time, with 24,081 watching the match. Billy Slater also played his 200th game.
In Round 25 the Storm lost 18–4 to the Manly-Warringah Sea Eagles in a violent match informally known as the "Battle of Brookvale". Adam Blair received a five-match suspension for his role in the match, meaning he had played his last game for the club.
The Melbourne Storm completed the regular season in first place winning the minor premiership.
Billy Slater was crowned Dally M Player of the Year at the Dally M Awards on 6 September 2011. Craig Bellamy also won coach of the year and Cameron Smith won the Representative player of the year award.
The Storm qualified for the 2011 NRL finals series and played the Newcastle Knights in Week 1, winning 18–8. This win gave them a one-week break and a home Preliminary Final against the New Zealand Warriors. The Storm lost this final 20-12 ending their season.

Milestone games

Jerseys
In 2011 the Storm jerseys were made by Kooga. They retained their predominantly purple home jersey from 2010 and also their predominantly white away jersey from 2010.

On 4 February 2011 Crown Casino was named the naming rights sponsor of the Storm in 2011 and chest sponsor on the jersey. Suzuki is also continuing as major sponsors as well with their name appearing on the sleeves. There is no sponsorship on the back of the jersey. Makita also announced a continuation of their sponsorship and their name will continue to appear on the shorts.

Special
 Round 5 (Heritage Round) – Melbourne wore a replica of their original 1998 home jersey.
 Round 20 – Storm wore a special "platinum" jersey against the Brisbane Broncos.

Melbourne Storm 2011 season crowd averages

Fixtures

Pre Season

Regular season - Rounds 1 to 12

Regular season - Rounds 13 to 26

Finals

Ladders

2011 Coaching Staff

NRL
 Head coach: Craig Bellamy
 Assistant coaches: David Kidwell & Kevin Walters
 Development coach: Tony Adam
 Specialist coach: Robbie Kearns
 Strength and conditioning Coach: Alex Corvo
 Assistant Strength and Conditioning Coaches: Adrian Jiminez & Dan Di Pasqua
 Head physiotherapist: Kieran Morgan
 Assistant physiotherapist: Andrew Nawrocki
 Head Trainer: Craig Sultana
 General Manager Football Operations: Frank Ponissi
 Recruitment manager: Darren Bell

NRL Under 20s
 Head coach: Dean Pay
 Assistant coach: Adam O'Brien
 Development coach: Chad Buckby
 High Performance Manager: Chris Jones
 Physiotherapist: Aaron Howlett

2011 squad

Awards

Trophy Cabinet
2011 J. J. Giltinan Shield

Melbourne Storm Awards Night
Melbourne Storm Player of the Year: Cameron Smith 
 Melbourne Storm Rookie of the Year: Gareth Widdop & Jesse Bromwich
 Melbourne Storm Members' Player of Year: Cooper Cronk
 Most Improved: Kevin Proctor
 Best Forward: Ryan Hinchcliffe
 Best Back: Billy Slater
 Best Try: Anthony Quinn vs Gold Coast Titans (Round 2)
 Darren Bell U20s Player of the Year: Slade Griffin
 U20s Best Forward: Krys Freeman
 U20s Best Back: Kirisome Auva'a
 Greg Brentnall Young Achievers Award: Mahe Fonua
 Mick Moore Club Person of the Year: Robbie Kearns
 Life Member Inductees: Peter Robinson, Billy Slater, Jonce Dimovski

Dally M Awards Night
 Dally M Medal: Billy Slater
 Dally M Fullback of the Year: Billy Slater
 Dally M Captain of the Year: Cameron Smith
 Dally M Hooker of the Year: Cameron Smith
 Dally M Representative Player of the Year: Cameron Smith
 Dally M Halfback of the Year: Cooper Cronk 
 Dally M Coach of the Year of the Year: Craig Bellamy

RLIF Awards
RLIF Player of the Year: Billy Slater
RLIF Fullback of the Year: Billy Slater
RLIF Hooker of the Year: Cameron Smith

Additional Awards
 Wally Lewis Medal: Cameron Smith

Notes

References

Melbourne Storm seasons
Melbourne Storm season